Madina khanum Qiyasbeyli (1889 – 1938) was an Azerbaijani educator, pedagogue, journalist and translator.

Life 
Madina was born in April 1889 in the village of Salahli of Qazax district in the family of Mehdi agha Vekilov, who was a great supporter of education. She got her primary religious-secular education from parents, and then in pedagogical school "Saint Nina" ("Müqəddəs Nina") in Tiflis. Then she finished one-year pedagogical course and in 1905 got pedagogue certificate. After graduating in 1906 at the age of 17 she opened first one-year country school for girls at her own house in home-country Salahli and worked there. 
She worked for development of education and culture for the whole life. Founded schools in Qazax and Gadabay regions; in 1918 became people's schools' inspector. After moving to Baku, she organized courses at the apartments where she lived and founded the first pedagogical school for Azerbaijani girls, who were supposed to work at Darumuellimat schools for girls. Worked as a teacher at schools of Baku and Agriculture University. As one of creators of "Eastern Woman" ("Şərq qadını") journal, she joined the struggle against ignorance and translated several works. Samad Vurgun, who had been translating A. S. Pushkin's novel "Eugeniy Onegin" was following her recommendations and advice. She translated into Russian "Foggy Tabriz" of Mammed Said Ordubadi and Abulhasan's "Yoxuşlar" novel.

During 1920-33s was principal of Darumuellimats, Russian-language teacher at Baku Universities, trained pedagogues.

Madina khanum Qiyasbeyli was arrested according to order No.1747 in December 1936, two years later she was executed by firing squad. Was justified two years later after death. Till 8 September 1937 was questioned 12 times, on 23 September accused in being member of Musavat party, having relationship with Mammad Emin Rasulzade, having connections with Musavatists in Iran and having anti-Soviet position. She was executed at the age of 49.

References 

1889 births
1938 deaths
Azerbaijani journalists
Azerbaijani women journalists
Executed Azerbaijani women
20th-century journalists